Zemné is a village and municipality in the Nové Zámky District in the Nitra Region of south-western Slovakia. The village is known as the birthplace of inventor Ányos Jedlik.

History
In historical records the village was first mentioned in 1113.

Geography
The municipality lies at an altitude of 111 metres and covers an area of 26.345 km². It has a population of about 2,210 people.

Demographics
The population is about 75% Hungarian, 15% Slovak and 10% Roma.

People
Ányos Jedlik, the Hungarian inventor born in Zemné in 1800.

Facilities
The village has a small public library and football pitch.

References

External links
 Official website
 Zemné – Nové Zámky Okolie

Villages and municipalities in Nové Zámky District
Hungarian communities in Slovakia